James Frank Kenly Jr. (April 18, 1877 – February 21, 1944) was an American engineer and college football player and coach. He served as the head football coach at Maryland Agricultural College—now known as the University of Maryland, College Park—for one season, in 1898, compiling a record of 2–5–1.

Biography
Kenly was born in Harford County near Level, Maryland on April 18, 1877.<ref name=record>[https://books.google.com/books?id=wDwwAAAAYAAJ Alumni Record of the Maryland Agricultural College: 1914], Maryland Agricultural College, p. 69, 1914.</ref> He enrolled at the Maryland Agricultural College in 1895, and played on the football team from 1896 to 1898 as a quarterback. In 1898, he served as the team's head coach and captain, and Maryland amassed a 2–5–1 record. After the season, the Reveille'' yearbook wrote, "Manager McCandlish and Captain Kenly worked faithfully with the material they had, but the team was deficient in weight as compared with the others of the league." He graduated from the Maryland Agricultural College in 1899 with a degree in mechanical engineering. Kenly worked for the Port Chester Bolt and Nut Company, Baldwin Locomotive Works, York Safe and Lock Company, H. S. Kerbaugh, Inc., American Bridge Company, Pennsylvania Steel Company, and the Carnegie Steel Company.

Kenly was married to Mavourneen (née Williams) Kenly. He later worked at the Federal Reserve Bank of Richmond Baltimore Branch. He died of a heart attack on February 21, 1944, at his home in Baltimore, Maryland.

Head coaching record

References

External links
 

1877 births
1944 deaths
19th-century players of American football
Player-coaches
American football quarterbacks
American mechanical engineers
Maryland Terrapins football coaches
Maryland Terrapins football players
Federal Reserve Bank people
People from Harford County, Maryland
Coaches of American football from Maryland
Players of American football from Maryland